The universal key or universal scale is a concept employed in music theory in which specific notes or chord symbols in a key signature are replaced with numbers or Roman numerals, allowing for a discussion describing relationships between notes or chords that can be universally applied to all key signatures.

For example, in the key of E-flat major, the notes of the scale would be replaced like so:
E becomes scale degree 1
F becomes scale degree 2
G becomes scale degree 3
A becomes scale degree 4
B becomes scale degree 5
C becomes scale degree 6
D becomes scale degree 7

Triads (common practice style)

When used with chord symbols, the Roman numerals represent the root of a triad built on the associated scale step.  In music theory based on the practices of the common practice period and its derivations the chord numerals are often written in upper case for chords in the major family, and in lower case for chords in the minor family, with the usual "m" or "—" minor chord quality suffix omitted outright:

E becomes I
Fm7 becomes ii7
Gm7 becomes iii7
Amaj7 becomes IV maj7
B7 becomes V7
Cm7 becomes vi7
Dø7 becomes viiø7

When representing the triads rooted in a minor key, the upper or lower case of the numerals indicate both its chord quality and that the key is minor:

Cm7 becomes i7
Dø7 becomes iiø7
E becomes III
Fm7 becomes iv7
Gm7 becomes v7
Amaj7 becomes VI maj7
B7 becomes VII7

A major drawback of using this method is its lack of use of accidentals. While in the numeric system, flats and sharps can be represented either by the use of fractions (e.g. an A natural in the scale above becomes ) or, more commonly in written text, by inserting an accidental before the number (e.g. the same note becomes 5 or 4).

Triads (jazz and popular style)

In music theory aimed towards jazz and popular music, all triads are represented by upper case numerals, followed by a symbol to indicate if it is not a major chord (e.g. "m" for minor or "ø" for half-diminished):

Emaj7 becomes I maj7
Fm7 becomes IIm7
Gm7 becomes IIIm7
Amaj7 becomes IV maj7
B7 becomes V7
Cm7 becomes VIm7
Dø7 becomes VIIø7

When representing the triads rooted in a minor key, accidentals are used to indicate the chromatic alteration from the assumed major key roots indicated by numerals that don't have accidentals:

E minor:

Em7 becomes Im7
Fmø7 becomes IIø7
Am7 becomes IVm7
Bm7 becomes Vm7
Cmaj7 becomes VImaj7
D7 becomes VII7

This will frequently result in numerals whose accidentals are different than those of the actual root note, as they are referring to a change from the assumed pitch and not an absolute pitch:

D minor:

Dm7 becomes Im7
Emø7 becomes IIø7
Gm7 becomes IVm7
Am7 becomes Vm7
Bmaj7 becomes VI maj7
C7 becomes VII7

Further reading
Baxter, John (2010). Deluxe Encyclopedia Of Mandolin Chords, p. 11. Mel Bay. .

Musical scales